, better known by his stage name Tama or  is a Japanese musician, lyricist and composer from Innoshima and a bass guitarist of Porno Graffitti in September 1999. After leaving the band in June 2004, he released the album Great Pleasure in December 2005.

Profile 
 Main use bass guitars:
 Fender Customshop Custom Jazz Bass built by Mark Kendrick
 Fender Jazz Bass ’63
 Fender Jazz Bass ’74
 Fender Jazz Bass Tama ver.

Discography

Singles 
 Metal Cool (November 1, 2006)
 Honnou (June 23, 2007)
 LOUD 　(January 23, 2008)

Albums 
Great Pleasure (December 21, 2005)
 Break it now feat. E.P.E
 Drift
 (Everywhere) ウィーゴー!!! ((Everywhere) We Go!!!)
 Fuzz Butterfly feat. azumi
 our Sin
 Macaroni (wes)
 Smoky
 Cannonball train
 Desert Moon
 3rd クライシス (3rd Crisis)
 Break it now (Melody Track)
 Fuzz Butterfly (Melody Track)

See also
 An Music School

External links 
 Official Website by SME Records 

1974 births
Japanese rock bass guitarists
Japanese composers
Japanese male composers
Japanese multi-instrumentalists
Living people
Musicians from Hiroshima Prefecture
Sony Music Entertainment Japan artists
Male bass guitarists
21st-century bass guitarists
21st-century Japanese male musicians
People from Onomichi, Hiroshima